Swami Bhoomananda Tirtha (Devanagari: स्वामी भूमानन्द तीर्थ; Malayalam: സ്വാമി ഭൂമാനന്ദ തീര്‍ത്ഥ), is an Indian Sannyasin and social reformer. He is known for his talks and discourses on Vedanta, Bhagavad Gita, Upanishads and Srimad Bhagavatam, and their practical application in daily life.  He has also organized various movements to end some unlawful rituals practiced by some Hindu temples.

Early life

Swami Bhoomananda Tirtha was born in 1933 in the village of Parlikad near Wadakkanchery in Thrissur district, in present-day Kerala, India.  He had his early education at Parlikad and later with his two brother Sanyasins started the Vyasa College, Parlikad.   During his professional life in Kolkata, he met Baba Gangadhara Paramahamsa, who later became his Guru and the association eventually led to his introduction to the world of spirituality.

Activities

Jnaana Yajnas

The Jnaana Yajnas (Knowledge dissemination programs) are a major part of Swami Bhoomananda Tirtha's Loka-sangraha (Welfare of the World) campaign. Since the first Jnaana Yajna held in Jamshedpur in 1964, these series of spiritual discourses are being held regularly in various parts of India, as well as in Malaysia and the U.S.A. Jnaana Yajnas are being held every year since 1964 in Jamshedpur and since 1975 in Delhi. Jnaana Yajnas are also held in Mumbai, Chennai and Bangalore every year.

Annual Srimad Bhaagavata Tattva Sameeksha Satram

This 2 week long series on discourses, explaining how to apply the contents and principles of Srimad Bhaagavatam in daily life, is held in Thrissur district every year in the month of December.

Gita Tattva Sameeksha

This series of talks on the Bhagavad Gita is conducted every year in Thrissur, in which Swami Bhoomananda Tirtha explains the values and message of Bhagavad Gita. This series began in the year 1995.

Socio-cultural reforms

Swami Bhoomananda Tirtha has conducted various movements for abolition of certain offensive and unlawful rituals and practices that were followed by some Hindu temples.  Prominent among these are the practice called Thookkam at the Elavur Puthankavu Temple in Ernakulam District, and the practice of singing obscene songs during the Bharani festival at the Kodungallur temple.

The Ashram

Narayanashrama Tapovanam, the headquarters of Swami Bhoomananda Tirtha, is located at Venginissery village, 10 km South-West of Thrissur city. The Centres for Inner Resource Development (C.I.R.D), which are remote centres of the Ashram, are located in Delhi and Jamshedpur in India, Vienna - Virginia in the U.S.A and the Society for Inner Resources Development (S.I.R.D) is based in Kuala Lumpur, Malaysia.

Foundation for Restoration of National Values

Under the inspiration and guidance of Swami Bhoomananda Tirtha, the Foundation for Restoration of National Values (FRNV) was set up in June 2008 to help promote national values in the Indian society. The advisory board of the FRNV consists of Justice M.N. Venkatachaliah - former Chief Justice of India, Sri Ratan N. Tata, Chairman – Tata group, Dr. E Sreedharan - MD - Delhi Metro Rail Corporation, Sri N. Vittal - former Central Vigilance Commissioner, Smt. Vibha Parthasarathi, educationist and former Chairperson of the National Commission for Women, and Sri. T.S Krishnamurthy, former Chief Election Commissioner.

Publications, books and periodicals

Vicharasetu (Path of Introspection), the English monthly journal published by Swami Bhoomananda Tirtha, was started in 1968. Hindi and Malayalam versions of the Journal (Vicharasetu and Vicharasarani respectively) are also being published.

Many books and CDs have been published by Swami Bhoomananda Tirtha in English, Malayalam, Hindi, Tamil and Bengali languages. Notable among them are the following.

Brahmavidya Abhyasa
Quietitude of the Mind
Divinizing every moment
My Beloved Baba.
Essential Concepts in Bhagavad gita
Vedantic Way of Living.
Prabhaata Rashmih:
To the Householder
Drops of Nectar from Srimad Bhaagavatam
Genesis & Relevance of Temple-worship

See also
Narayanashrama Tapovanam
Vedanta
List of people from Kerala

References

External links

http://www.brahmavidya.org
http://www.cirdna.org
http://www.valuefoundation.in
http://www.sirdmsia.org

1933 births
20th-century Hindu religious leaders
21st-century Hindu religious leaders
People from Thrissur district
Living people
Indian Hindu saints